Chester Leroy "Red" Torkelson (March 19, 1894 – September 22, 1964), was a Major League Baseball pitcher who played in  with the Cleveland Indians. He batted and threw right-handed. Torkelson had a 2-1 record, with a 7.66 ERA, in four games, in his one-year career. He was born and died in Chicago, Illinois.

External links

1894 births
1964 deaths
Major League Baseball pitchers
Baseball players from Illinois
Cleveland Indians players
American people of Norwegian descent
Minor league baseball managers
Marshalltown Ansons players
New Orleans Pelicans (baseball) players
Mobile Bears players
Beaumont Exporters players